is a rally racing arcade video game released by Jaleco in 1989. Rendered in 3D, the game is the first to be set in the Paris-Dakar rally raid which the player drives a Porsche 959, resembling that of the 1986 winner.  Opponents in the game resemble Peugeot 205 T16s, which went on to win in the 1987 Paris-Dakar rally, with Mitsubishi Pajeros also appearing occasionally.

There are two games in the series: Big Run – The Supreme 4WD Challenge – 11e Rallye (1989) and Big Run – The Supreme 4WD Challenge – 13e Rallye (1991, Super Famicom)

Big Run was also ported to the Amiga and Atari ST.

Super Famicom version 

The race proceeds in a straight line without any 360° effects to simulate the road turning around in a different direction. Most of the turns are on a 30° angle, forcing the player to turn sharply to the left or right. At the end of the game, there is a message that says "Those who have tasted the waters of Africa will always long to be here" along with some synthesized beats. This message will play right after the "game over" screen no matter if the player wins or loses the game.

The object of the game is to travel from the cosmopolitan landscape of Tripoli, Libya to the swamp regions of West Africa (including the target of Dakar) in a rally race. Hitting various environmental obstacles or other vehicles will damage the player's vehicle. Taking too much damage will result in trouble for the vehicle's components.

There are many navigators (one female, five male) that know all the roads in Africa (the signals are given by nudges to turn either left or right). In addition, there are many corporate sponsors (with names sounding similar to real life corporations), auto mechanics, and automobile parts to choose from as the player goes for more than  through tricky terrain. Deserts, jungles, and even darkness pose challenges to the player. The object is to finish each leg of the rally before time runs out (failing to achieve this goal will result in a disqualification and an immediate game over, like in the real life rally circuit). Navigators help by directing players safely past areas of darkness in the race. Engine parts must be replaced by mechanics approximately every . Racing equipment (tires, engine, brakes) must be packed up in the vehicle, creating extra weight that slows down the vehicle's top speed rating.
The goal is to have as many replacement parts as possible while keeping the vehicle as light as possible. Emergencies do not cost money but will cause the player to lose time on the clock while waiting for the repair truck to appear. Having no parts will eventually cause the vehicle to stall on the rally, eating up the player's limited time.

Reception 
In Japan, Game Machine listed Big Run on their November 15, 1989, issue as being the second most-successful upright arcade game of the month. It went on to become Japan's fourth highest-grossing dedicated arcade game of 1990, below Super Monaco GP, Winning Run Suzuka GP and Special Criminal Investigation. In North America, it was the top-grossing new video game on the RePlay arcade charts in January 1990.

Commodore User reviewed the arcade game, giving it an 85% score.

Notes

References

External links 

Big Run (Commodore Amiga) at GameFAQs

1989 video games
1991 video games
Amiga games
Arcade video games
Atari ST games
City Connection franchises
Super Nintendo Entertainment System games
Jaleco games
Racing video games
Rally racing video games
Off-road racing video games
Dakar Rally video games
Video games developed in Japan
Video games set in Africa
Video games set in Libya